Marius Jean Antonin Mercié (October 30, 1845 in Toulouse – December 12, 1916 in Paris), was a French sculptor, medallist and painter.

Biography 

Mercié entered the École des Beaux-Arts, Paris, and studied under Alexandre Falguière and François Jouffroy, and in 1868 gained the Grand Prix de Rome at the age of 23.  His first great popular successes were the David and Gloria Victis, which was shown and received the Medal of Honour of the Paris Salon. The bronze was subsequently placed in the Square Montholon.

The bronze David was one of his most popular works. The Biblical hero is depicted naked with the head of Goliath at his feet like Donatello's David, but with a turbanned head and sheathing his long sword. Numerous reproductions exist, most of which incorporate a loincloth that covers David's genitalia but not his buttocks.

Mercié was appointed Professor of Drawing and Sculpture at the École des Beaux-Arts, and was elected a member of the Académie française in 1891, after being awarded the biennial prize of the Institute of 800 in 1887. He was subsequently elected to grand officier of the Légion d'honneur, and in 1913 became the president of the Société des artistes français. Marie-Antoinette Demagnez was among his many students at the École des Beaux-Arts. He died in Paris on December 12, 1916.

Works 

The Genius of the Arts (1877), a relief, is in the Tuileries, in substitution for Antoine-Louis Barye's Napoleon III. A similar work for the tomb of Jules Michelet (1879; designed with architect Jean-Louis Pascal) is in Père Lachaise Cemetery, and in the same year Mercié produced the statue of Arago with accompanying reliefs, now erected at Perpignan.

In 1882 he repeated his great patriotic success of 1874 with a group Quand Même!, replicas of which have been set up at Belfort and in the garden of the Tuileries. Le Souvenir (1885), a marble statue for the tomb of Charles Ferry, is one of his most beautiful works. Regret, for the tomb of Alexandre Cabanel, was produced in 1892, along with William Tell, subsequently at Lausanne.

Mercié also designed the monuments to Jean-Louis-Ernest Meissonier (1895), erected in the Jardin de l'Infante in the Louvre, and Louis Faidherbe (1896) at Lille, a statue of Adolphe Thiers set up at St Germain-en-Laye, the monument to Paul Baudry at Père Lachaise, and that of Louis-Philippe and Queen Amélie for their tomb at Dreux. His stone group of Justice is at the Hôtel de Ville, Paris.

Numerous other statues, portrait busts, and medallions came from the sculptor's hand, which gained him a medal of honor at the Paris Exhibition (1878) and the grand prix at that of 1889. Among the paintings exhibited by the artist are a Venus, to which was awarded a medal in 1883, Leda (1884), and Michelangelo studying Anatomy (1885), his most dramatic work in this medium.

Mercié is known in America primarily for three monuments: the 1890 Robert E. Lee equestrian bronze on Monument Avenue in Richmond, Virginia (the Robert E. Lee Monument), which was removed in September 2021; his 1891 collaboration with former teacher Alexandre Falguière on the statue of the Marquis de Lafayette in Lafayette Square, Washington, D.C.; and the 1911 Francis Scott Key Monument in Baltimore, Maryland.

Gallery

See also
 List of works by Antonin Mercié

References

Further reading
DuPriest Jr., James E. and Douglas O. Tice, Jr. Monument & Boulevard:Richmond's Grand Avenues, A Richmond Discoveries Publication, Richmond, Virginia, 1996
Goode, James M. The Outdoor Sculpture of Washington, D.C., Smithsonian Institution Press, Washington, D.C. 1974
Mackay, James, The Dictionary of Sculptors in Bronze, Antique Collectors Club,  Woodbridge, Suffolk  1977
Rusk, William Sener, Art in Baltimore: Monuments and Memorials, The Norman Remington Company, baltimore, 1924

External links

Smithsonian biography
Art Renewal Center
Insecula (French language): index to pages on selected works (it may be necessary to close an advertising window to view this page)
Webshots: a visitor photo of Mercié's David
 

1845 births
1916 deaths
19th-century French painters
French male painters
20th-century French painters
20th-century French male artists
Academic art
Prix de Rome for sculpture
Grand Officiers of the Légion d'honneur
Members of the Académie des beaux-arts
20th-century French sculptors
19th-century French sculptors
French male sculptors
Honorary Members of the Royal Academy
19th-century French male artists